Blitzkrieg are  an English heavy metal band formed in Leicester in 1980. The current line-up consists of Brian Ross (vocals), Alan Ross (guitar), Liam Ferguson (bass), Matt Graham (drums), and Nick Jennison (guitar). Ross is the only remaining member from the band's founding, and the band are now based in Newcastle.

History
In 1980, Brian Ross joined Leicester band Split Image (comprising guitarists Jim Sirotto and Ian Jones, bassist Steve English, and drummer Steve Abbey), and after a change of name to Blitzkrieg, their demo led to a record deal in October 1980 with Neat Records, a label that was signing many of the bands involved with the new wave of British heavy metal movement. After a single released in 1981, Jones and English were replaced by John Antcliffe and Mick Moore. In the early stages of Blitzkrieg's career they regularly produced gigs in England, but then later split in 1981 before the band's debut album was completed. Brian Ross most notably went on to join Satan, another metal band, along with stints in Avenger, Lone Wolf and Unter den Linden. 

In 1984, Ross reformed the band, with Sirotto, and Moore, the line-up bolstered by guitarist Mick Proctor (of Tygers of Pan Tang) and drummer Sean Taylor (Satan/Blind Fury, ex-Raven) to record the Blitzkrieg album that was originally planned to be released in 1981, A Time of Changes. It was released in 1985. 

"Blitzkrieg", the B-side of the band's debut single, was covered by Metallica for the B-side of the 1984 single "Creeping Death". Metallica were fans of Blitzkrieg and before they were signed had sent Ross a demo to try to get signed to Neat Records, for whom Ross was then doing A&R work.

In 1991, Roadracer Records released the 10 Years of Blitzkrieg, and the band recorded new material which was combined with older tracks on the Unholy Trinity album, the release of which was delayed until 1995 due to contractual issues. The band continued with Ross the only constant member, releasing the albums Ten (1997), The Mists of Avalon (1998), Absolute Power (2002), Absolutely Live (2004), Sins and Greed (2005), and Theatre of the Damned (2007). 

After a six-year gap, the band returned in 2013 with the album Back from Hell. A re-recorded and expanded version of A Time of Changes was released in 2015 to celebrate 30 years since the original release. The band's latest album, Judge Not!, was released in 2018, with an EP, Loud and Proud, following in 2019.

Band members

Current
Brian Ross – vocals (1980–1981, 1984–1991, 1992–1994, 1996–1999, 2001–present)
Alan Ross – guitars (2012–present)
Liam Ferguson – bass (2019–present)
Matt Graham – drums (2015–present)
Nick Jennison – guitars (2020–present)

Former

Guitars
Ian Jones (1980–1981, deceased 2009)
Jim Sirotto (1980–1981, 1984–1986)
John Antcliffe (1981)
Mick Proctor (1984–1986)
J D Binnie (1986–1987)
Chris Beard (1986–1987)
Steve Robertson (1988–1989)
Glenn S. Howes (1988–1990, 1996–1999)
Tony J. Liddle (1989–1996, 2001–2002)
Phil Millar (1996)
Martin Richardson (1996–1998)
Paul Nesbitt (1992, 1998–2006)
Guy Laverick (2006–2011)
Ken Johnson (2002–present)

Bass
Steve English (1980–1981)
Mick Moore (1981, 1984–1986, 1991)
Darren Parnaby (1986–1987)
Robbie Robertson (1988–1989)
Glenn Carey (1989–1990)
Dave Anderson (1992–1994)
Steve Ireland (1996)
Gavin Gray (1996–1999)
Andy Galloway (2001–2004)
Bill Baxter (2012–2017)
Huw Holding (2017–2019)

Drums
Steve Abbey (1980–1981)
Sean Taylor (1984–1986, 1991–1994)
Sean Wilkinson (1986–1987)
Kyle Gibson (1988–1989)
Gary Young (1989–1990)
Paul Ward (1996)
Paul White (1996)
Neil Nattrass (1996)
Mark Hancock (1996–1998)
Mark Windebank (1998–1999)
Phil Brewis (1999–2012)
Mick Kerrigan (2012–2015)
Matt Graham (2015–present)

Timeline

Discography

See also

List of new wave of British heavy metal bands

References

Musical groups established in 1980
Musical groups disestablished in 1981
Musical groups reestablished in 1984
Musical groups disestablished in 1991
Musical groups reestablished in 1992
Musical groups disestablished in 1994
Musical groups reestablished in 1996
Musical groups disestablished in 1999
Musical groups reestablished in 2001
English heavy metal musical groups
Musical quintets
New Wave of British Heavy Metal musical groups
Neat Records artists